Pierre Rabischong (born 1932, Nancy, France) is a neuroanatomist and an emeritus professor at the University of Montpellier in France. He is known for his work in rehabilitation medicine and physiotherapy, as well as powered orthoses. He was the leader of the AMOLL (active modular orthosis for lower limbs) project  in 1975.

References

1932 births
Living people
French anatomists
Academic staff of the University of Montpellier